ADH-1 (brand name Exherin) is a small, cyclic pentapeptide vascular-targeting drug. It was developed by Adherex Technologies.

ADH-1 selectively and competitively binds to and blocks N-cadherin, which may result in disruption of tumor vasculature, inhibition of tumor cell growth, and the induction of tumor cell and endothelial cell apoptosis.  N-cadherin, a cell- surface transmembrane glycoprotein of the cadherin superfamily of proteins involved in calcium-mediated cell–cell adhesion and signaling mechanisms; may be upregulated in some aggressive tumors and the endothelial cells and pericytes of some tumor blood vessels.

In 2006, Adherex and NCI formed a Clinical Trial Agreement stating that NCI will sponsor clinical trials of ADH-1 in a variety of cancer types. ADH-1 received orphan drug status from the FDA in 2008.

In a pilot study (phase I trial), ADH-1 intravenous pretreatment before chemotherapy in metastatic melanoma completely destroyed tumors in half of patients.  It is being investigated for advanced extremity melanoma in phase II trials.

References

Experimental cancer drugs
Cyclic peptides
Pentapeptides